Bulimulus tenuissimus is a species of tropical air-breathing land snail, a pulmonate gastropod mollusk in the subfamily Bulimulinae.

Distribution
The native distribution of Bulimulus tenuissimus includes:
 Brazil – widespread in Brazil

The non-indigenous distribution includes:
 North Carolina, USA

Description
The shell is perforate, ovate-conic, very thin, pellucid, scarcely shining, obsoletely and closely decussated by growth striae and delicate spiral lines. The shell is pale corneous in color, sometimes fulvous. The spire is conoid. The apex is rather acute. The suture is simple. The shell has six whorls that are slightly convex, increasing with moderate rapidity. The last whorl is convex, not descending in front, somewhat attenuated at base. The columella is suboblique, sometimes nearly vertical.

The aperture is oval, colored like the exterior, onehalf the shell's length. The peristome is simple, unexpanded, acute. The right margin is regularly arcuate. The columellar margin is reflexed above, nearly covering the perforation.

The width of the shell is 9 mm. The height of the shell is 17 mm.

Ecology
The reproductive biology of this species was studied by Silva et al. (2008): These hermaphroditic snails are mating and cross-fertilization normally occurs. When snails are isolated then self-fertilization can occur, but with the lower reproductive success. Eggs are laid in clutches from one to 252 eggs (in captivity). Snails are hatched after about 20 days.

Bulimulus tenuissimus has long lifespan.

Bulimulus tenuissimus can be fed for example with calcium and commercial bird food, lettuce or rations of various food components.

Bulimulus tenuissimus is a host for a trematode of the genus Postharmostomum (family Brachylaimidae).

Strongyluris-like larvae are a parasite of Bulimulus tenuissimus.

Malacophagula neotropica (family Sarcophagidae) is a parasite of Bulimulus tenuissimus.

A firefly is a predator of Bulimulus tenuissimus.

References
This article incorporates public domain text from the reference.

Further reading
 Araújo J. L. B., Rezende H. E. B. & Rodrigues P. A. F. (1960). "Sobre “Bulimulus tenuissimus” (Orbigny, 1835) (Gastropoda, Pulmonata)". Revista Brasileira de Biologia 20(1): 33–42.
 Rezende H. E. B. & Lanzieri P. D. (1964). "Observações anatômicas e histológicas sobre “Bulimulus tenuissimus” (Orbigny, 1835) (Gastropoda, Pulmonata, Bulimulidae)". Revista Brasileira de Biologia 24(4): 409–415.
  Silva L. C., Meireles L. O., Junqueira F. O. & Bessa B. A. (2009). "Influência da umidade do substrato sobre crescimento, produção de ovos e sobrevivência de Bulimulus tenuissimus (d’Orbigny, 1835) (Mollusca, Bulimulidae) sob condições de laboratório". Revista Brasileira de Biociências 7(2): 144–149. http://www.ufrgs.br/seerbio/ojs/index.php/rbb/article/view/999

Bulimulus
Gastropods described in 1835